Agustín Alcantara Montero (born August 26, 1977) is a Dominican former professional baseball pitcher. He played in Major League Baseball (MLB) for the Chicago White Sox.

Career
On April 20, 2005, Montero became the third player to test positive under Major League Baseball's new steroid policy, and was suspended for 10 days without pay. Although he had not played in the Major Leagues at that time, he was on the Rangers' 40-man roster during spring training, and was subject to random testing.

He signed a minor league contract with the Oakland Athletics on June 9, 2007. He was later released and signed with the Northwest Independent League on May 27, 2008.

See also
List of sportspeople sanctioned for doping offences

References

External links

Agustin Montero at Baseball Almanac

1977 births
Living people
Arizona League Athletics players
Charlotte Knights players
Chicago White Sox players
Dominican Republic expatriate baseball players in Canada
Dominican Republic expatriate baseball players in the United States
Dominican Republic sportspeople in doping cases
Edmonton Cracker-Cats players
Frisco RoughRiders players
Jacksonville Suns players
Las Vegas 51s players
Major League Baseball pitchers
Major League Baseball players from the Dominican Republic
Major League Baseball players suspended for drug offenses 
Oklahoma RedHawks players
Sportspeople from San Pedro de Macorís
Sacramento River Cats players
Southern Oregon Timberjacks players
Vero Beach Dodgers players
Yakima Bears players
Estrellas Orientales players
Gigantes de Carolina players
Dominican Republic expatriate baseball players in Puerto Rico
Great Falls Dodgers players
Leones del Escogido players
San Bernardino Spirit players
Tiburones de La Guaira players
Vaqueros Laguna players
Wilmington Waves players
Dominican Republic expatriate baseball players in Venezuela